Michael Edward Lynn (born November 25, 1945) is an American former professional basketball player. He won two NCAA championships playing college basketball for the UCLA Bruins, then played professionally for two seasons in the National Basketball Association (NBA).

Lynn, a 6'7 forward from Covina High School in Covina, California, played for UCLA from 1964 to 1968.  He won a championship as a sophomore (1965) and again as a fifth-year senior starter in 1968.  Lynn was suspended for the 1966–67 championship year due to legal trouble concerning a credit card reported lost.  He was a first-team All-AAWU pick as a junior in 1966.

After his collegiate career ended, Lynn was drafted twice by the NBA – first in the 1967 NBA draft by the San Francisco Warriors (fifth round, #51 overall) and again in the 1968 NBA draft by the Chicago Bulls (fourth round, #39 overall).  He played two NBA seasons from 1969 to 1971, his first for the Los Angeles Lakers and his second for the Buffalo Braves.  For his career, Lynn averaged 2.6 points and 1.4 rebounds in 49 games.

References

External links
 

1945 births
Living people
American men's basketball players
Basketball players from California
Buffalo Braves expansion draft picks
Buffalo Braves players
Chicago Bulls draft picks
Forwards (basketball)
Los Angeles Lakers players
People from Covina, California
San Francisco Warriors draft picks
Sportspeople from Los Angeles County, California
UCLA Bruins men's basketball players